Peter Barnes may refer to:

Politicians
Peter J. Barnes Jr. (1928–2018), American politician
Peter J. Barnes III (1956–2021), American politician

Sportsmen
Peter Barnes (footballer) (born 1957), English football player
Pete Barnes (born 1945), American football player

Others
Peter Barnes (entrepreneur) (born 1940), American businessman and environmentalist
Peter Barnes (Irish republican) (1907–1940), IRA member, perpetrator of the 1939 Coventry bombing
Peter Barnes (journalist), senior Washington correspondent for the Fox Business Network
Peter Barnes (lighting designer) (born 1955), English lighting designer and show producer
Peter Barnes (pilot) (1962–2013), British helicopter pilot
Peter Barnes (playwright) (1931–2004), English playwright and screenwriter
Peter J. Barnes (respiratory scientist) (born 1946), British respiratory scientist and clinician

See also
John Peter Barnes (1881–1959), United States federal judge